The New Zealand bravery awards are civil (non-military) decorations for bravery.

Since the end of WW2 there have been constant moves towards an independent New Zealand honours system.  This has resulted in a new system of New Zealand honours, military gallantry and civil bravery awards, and campaign medals.

See also
 New Zealand gallantry awards
 New Zealand campaign medals
 New Zealand Honours Order of Precedence
 New Zealand Royal Honours System

Civil awards and decorations of New Zealand